The Journal of Group Theory is a bimonthly peer-reviewed mathematical journal covering all aspects of group theory. It was established in 1998 and is published by Walter de Gruyter. The editor-in-chief is Chris Parker (University of Birmingham).

Abstracting and indexing 
The journal is abstracted and indexed in:

Its 2018 MCQ is 0.48. According to the Journal Citation Reports, the journal has a 2018 impact factor of 0.47, and the 5-year impact factor is 0.52.

References

External links 
 

Mathematics journals
Bimonthly journals
De Gruyter academic journals
Publications established in 1998
English-language journals